Najafabad (also Romanized as Najafābād; also known as Najaf Abad Kharaghan Gharbi) is a village in Abgarm Rural District, Abgarm District, Avaj County, Qazvin Province, Iran. At the 2006 census, its population was 263, in 76 families.

References 

Populated places in Avaj County